Alfred Jansson, born December 11, 1863 in Kil, Värmland, died September 4, 1931 in Chicago, was a Swedish-American landscape painter. 

He studied in Stockholm and Paris before emigrating to USA in 1889 and settling in Chicago. He painted landscapes of prairie and winter scenes. 

Jansson's painting Sunset in the Park is in Nationalmuseum, Snösamt in Smålands museum in Växjö and other works are in several American museums.

Gallery

Sources
 
 Svenskt konstnärslexikon, vol III site 261, Allhems Förlag, Malmö

References

 
20th-century Swedish painters
19th-century American painters
1863 births
1931 deaths
Swedish emigrants to the United States
20th-century American painters